Maling River is a river in northern Lipu, in Guangxi, China. It rises in northwestern Lipu, and flows generally southeast, passing through the towns of Hualong, Shuangjiang and Maling and joining the Lipu River in the town of Dongchang.

References

Bibliography

Rivers of Guangxi